Verkhovino is a rural locality (a village) in Kemskoye Rural Settlement, Nikolsky District, Vologda Oblast, Russia. The population was 114 as of 2002.

Geography 
Verkhovino is located 54 km west of Nikolsk (the district's administrative centre) by road. Starina is the nearest rural locality.

References 

Rural localities in Nikolsky District, Vologda Oblast